The Finnish women's national ice hockey team represents Finland at the International Ice Hockey Federation (IIHF) Women's World Championships, the Olympic Games, the Four Nations Cup, and other international-level women's ice hockey competitions. The women's national team is overseen by the Finnish Ice Hockey Association and its general manager is Tuula Puputti. Finland's national women's program is ranked third in the world by the IIHF and had 5,858 active players .

History
Finland has finished third or fourth in almost every World Championships and Olympics, with one exception being a fifth place finish at the 2014 Winter Olympics and second place at the 2019 World Championship. They are ranked behind Canada (#2) and the United States (#1). Historically, Finland's primary rival was Sweden, which finished second to Canada at the 2006 Winter Olympics. Finland finished fourth, losing the game for the bronze medal to the United States. Finland defeated the United States for the first time, at the 2008 World Championship in China, 1–0 in overtime. Finland defeated Canada 4–3 for the first time at the 2017 World Championship in the United States. However, Finland lost the semi-final game against Canada in the same tournament, proceeding to win the bronze medal game.

At the 2019 World Championship, Finland reached the championship final for the first time in tournament history after beating Canada 4–2 in the semi-final. During the gold medal game, Petra Nieminen scored in overtime but her goal was overturned after a video review for goalie interference. The IIHF released a press statement the next day citing rules 186 and 183ii as the reasons for overturning the goal. Finland finished as runners-up and won a silver medal after losing to the United States in a shootout.

Tournament record

Olympic Games

World Championships
Breaks indicate Olympic years.

European Championship

3/4 Nations Cup
1995 – Finished in 4th place (4 Nations Cup)
1996 – Won Bronze Medal 
1997 – Won Bronze Medal 
1998 – Won Bronze Medal 
1999 – Won Bronze Medal 
2000 – Won Bronze Medal  (4 nations Cup)
2001 – Won Silver Medal 
2002 – Won Bronze Medal  (4 Nations Cup)
2003 – Won Bronze Medal  (4 Nations Cup)
2004 – Finished in 4th place (4 Nations Cup)
2005 –  Won Bronze Medal  (4 Nations Cup)
2006 – Finished in 4th place (4 Nations Cup)
2007 – Won Bronze Medal  (4 Nations Cup)
2008 – Finished in 4th place (4 Nations Cup)
2009 – Finished in 4th place (4 Nations Cup)
2010 – Won Bronze Medal  (4 Nations Cup)
2011 – Finished in 4th place (4 Nations Cup)
2012 – Finished in 4th place (4 Nations Cup)
2013 – Won Silver Medal  (4 Nations Cup)
2014 – Finished in 4th place (4 Nations Cup)
2015 – Won Bronze Medal  (4 Nations Cup)
2016 – Won Bronze Medal  (4 Nations Cup)
2017 – Won Bronze Medal  (4 Nations Cup)
2018 – Won Bronze Medal  (4 Nations Cup)

Women's Nations Cup
Formerly known as the Air Canada Cup, the MLP Nations Cup and the Meco Cup.
2003 – Won Bronze Medal  (Air Canada Cup)
2004 – Finished in 4th place (Air Canada Cup)
2005 – Won Silver Medal  (Air Canada Cup)
2006 – Won Silver Medal  (Air Canada Cup)
2007 – Finished in 6th place (Air Canada Cup)
2008 – Won Silver Medal  (Air Canada Cup)
2009 – Finished in 5th place ( MLP Nations Cup)
2010 – Finished in 5th place ( MLP Nations Cup)
2011 – Finished in 6th place ( MLP Nations Cup)
2012 – Won Silver Medal  (Meco Cup)
2013 – Won Bronze Medal  (Meco Cup)
2014 – Won Gold Medal  (Meco Cup)
2015 – Won Bronze Medal  (Meco Cup)
2016 – Won Silver Medal  (Women's Nations Cup)
2017 – Won Gold Medal  (Women's Nations Cup)
2018 – Won Bronze Medal  (Women's Nations Cup)

Canada Cup
2009 Canada Cup – Won Bronze Medal

Team

Current roster

The roster for the 2022 IIHF Women's World Championship.

Head coach: Juuso Toivola

Awards and honors

IIHF Women's World Championship

Directorate awards
Best Goalie
Noora Räty: 2007, 2008, 2011, 2017, 2019
Anni Keisala: 2021
Best Defenceman
Kirsi Hänninen: 1999
Jenni Hiirikoski: 2009, 2012, 2013, 2015, 2016, 2017, 2019
Best Forward
Katja Riipi: 2000
Riikka Nieminen: 1990, 1994
Most Valuable Player
Noora Räty: 2008
Jenni Hiirikoski: 2019

All-Star teams 

 1997: Riikka Nieminen (F)
 2008: Noora Räty (G)
 2009: Michelle Karvinen (F)
 2011: Michelle Karvinen (F)
 2013: Noora Räty (G)
 2015: Jenni Hiirikoski (D), Meeri Räisänen (G)
 2016: Jenni Hiirikoski (D), Meeri Räisänen (G)
 2017: Jenni Hiirikoski (D), Noora Räty (G)
 2019: Jenni Hiirikoski (D), Michelle Karvinen (F), Noora Räty (G)
 2021: Anni Keisala (G), Petra Nieminen (F)

See also
2009–10 Finland women's national ice hockey team
Finland women's national under-18 ice hockey team
Women's ice hockey in Finland

References

External links
 
IIHF profile

 
Ice hockey teams in Finland
Women's national ice hockey teams in Europe
1988 establishments in Finland